"Death and All His Friends" is a song by British rock band Coldplay. It was written by all members of the band for their fourth album, Viva la Vida or Death and All His Friends, and is the tenth and final track on the album. The song begins with Chris Martin singing softly to a piano accompaniment before morphing into an uplifting arrangement featuring drums, chiming guitars, and a choir recorded in an art gallery in Barcelona. After the song fades out, a hidden song featured on the album, entitled "The Escapist", brings the total length of the track up to over six minutes and concludes the album. "The Escapist" is an ambient music piece that consists of a sample of "Light Through the Veins" by Jon Hopkins, with different mixing and with added vocals and lyrics by Chris Martin. A brief 40 second section of the instrumental of "The Escapist" is what begins the first track on the album, "Life in Technicolor", making the album cyclical.

A live version of "Death and All His Friends" was featured on the band's 2009 live album, LeftRightLeftRightLeft.

Writing and composition 
The "quiet half" of the song was originally a separate song altogether named "School". "School" was originally intended to be an introduction to another Coldplay song entitled "Rainy Day" that was later featured on the Prospekt's March EP. However, "School" was eventually re-worked into the current state of "Death and All His Friends".

Singer Chris Martin also revealed in an interview for MTV that the name of the song was supposed to be the theme of the album. He said, "We're aware of all the bad stuff in life, you know, but that doesn't mean you should ever give in to it, you know? So we all sing that bit together really loudly, as kind of a message to ourselves: never giving up and never focusing on the bad stuff too much."

While the band was working on the song, producer Brian Eno was the most obsessed with finishing it, even creating the line "I don't want a cycle of recycled revenge".

The song was recorded in several different places around the world such as Barcelona, London and New York City, taking several months for it to be finalized.

Credits and Personnel 
 Chris Martin – lead vocals, piano
 Guy Berryman – bass guitar, synthesizers, backing vocals
 Jonny Buckland – electric guitar
 Will Champion – drums, percussion, backing vocals

Charts and certifications

Charts

Certifications

References

2008 songs
Coldplay songs
Song recordings produced by Brian Eno
Song recordings produced by Jon Hopkins
Song recordings produced by Markus Dravs
Song recordings produced by Rik Simpson
Songs written by Guy Berryman
Songs written by Jonny Buckland
Songs written by Will Champion
Songs written by Chris Martin